A jump kick is a type of kick in certain martial arts and in martial-arts based gymnastics, with the particularity that the kick is delivered mid-air, specifically moving ("flying") into the target after a running start to gain forward momentum. In this sense, a "Jump kick" is a special case of a flying kick, any kick delivered in mid-air, i.e. with neither foot touching the ground.

Flying and jump kicks are taught in certain Asian martial arts, such as karate, kenpo, kalarippayattu, kung fu and taekwondo.


History

High kicks in general, as well as jump kicks, were foreign to Southern styles, and their presence in Wing Chun as well as Japanese and Korean martial arts is probably due to the influence of the  Northern style of chinese martial arts.
Historically, the development and diffusion of flying kick techniques in Asian martial arts seems to have taken place during the 1930s to 1950s. 
During this time, Chinese martial arts took an influence on traditional Okinawan martial arts, from the late 1940s specifically    Shorinji Kempo. Okinawan martial arts in turn developed into karate and ultimately also taekwondo. Taekwondo's special emphasis on spinning, jumping and flying kicks is a development of the 1960s.

Technique
Effective accomplishment of a flying kick relies on a mental preparation combined with an athletic condition. For instance, a typical element of the preparation consists in mentally exercising and visualizing the flying kick before its execution. A flying kick correctly performed requires the individual to land on their feet while keeping balance.

Practicality and purpose

While the efficiency of a jump kick in combat sports or self-defense is highly debatable,
the move is popular for demonstration purposes, showing off the practitioner's skill and control, as a dance move, or in cinema.

Flying kicks (regardless of concerns of utility) are considered among the martial arts techniques most difficult to perform correctly. A 1991 essay dedicated to flying kicks in taekwondo cites trainer Yeon Hwan Park arguing that the main benefit of training flying kicks is "the transcending of mental barriers by overcoming physical challenges that gives the student confidence." Park emphasizes that flying and jump kicks are among the most difficult and advanced techniques, and that he does not recommend their use in tournament situations, but at the same time he surmises that they might in theory be performed effectively even in self-defense situations once their execution has been mastered.

See also
Butterfly kick
Dropkick
Jump inside kick

References

George Chung, Cynthia Rothrock, Advanced Dynamic Kicks,  Black Belt Communications, 1986, .

External links
Taekwondo Kicks

Kicks